John Edward Afful is a Ghanaian politician and a member of the Second Parliament Parliament of the Fourth Republic representing the Abura-Asebu-Kwamankese Constituency in the Central Region of Ghana.

Early life 
Afful was born in Abura/Asebu/Kwamankese in the Central Region of Ghana.

Politics 
Afful was elected into Parliament on the ticket of the National Democratic Congress as a member of Parliament for the Abura-Asebu-Kwamankese in the Central Region of Ghana. He polled 20,262 votes out of the 33,585 valid votes cast representing 44.10% over his opponents Andrew Kingsford Mensah of the New Patriotic Party who polled 13,088 votes representing 28.50% and Emmanuel F. Appiah-Kibi of the Convention People's Party who also polled 235 votes representing 0.50%. While in parliament, he was appointed Minister of Environment, Science and Technology.

References

Year of birth missing (living people)
Living people
Ghanaian MPs 1997–2001
National Democratic Congress (Ghana) politicians
Government ministers of Ghana
People from Central Region (Ghana)